39 Signal Regiment may refer to:
 39 (Skinners) Signal Regiment, a British military unit
 39 Signal Regiment (Canada), a Canadian military unit